The 1946–47 Montreal Canadiens season was the 38th season in club history. The team placed first in the regular season to qualify for the playoffs. The Canadiens lost in the Stanley Cup finals against the Toronto Maple Leafs four games to two.

Regular season

Final standings

Record vs. opponents

Schedule and results

Playoffs

Stanley Cup Finals

Player statistics

Regular season
Scoring

Goaltending

Playoffs
Scoring

Goaltending

Awards and records
 Hart Memorial Trophy : Maurice Richard
 Vezina Trophy : Bill Durnan

Transactions

See also
 1946–47 NHL season

References
 Canadiens on Hockey Database
 Canadiens on NHL Reference

Montreal Canadiens seasons
Montreal
Montreal